The 2022 Conwy County Borough Council election took place on Thursday 5 May 2022 to elect all 55 members of Conwy County Borough Council. It was held on the same day as all other councils in Wales, as part of the 2022 Welsh local elections.

The election saw the amount of councillors elected to Conwy County Borough Council reduced, from 59 to 55, as part of boundary changes to the council carried out by the Local Democracy and Boundary Commission for Wales. All 55 seats across 30 wards were contested, an increase from the 2017 Conwy County Borough Council election, which saw 6 wards return councillors unopposed.

Election summary

Ward results 
The percentage shown for each candidate in multi-member wards is a percentage of the vote against the turnout of the election, as due to the nature of multi member wards, electors each have an amount of votes equal to the amount of seats available, however each elector does not have to use all their available votes.

Betws-y-Coed and Trefriw

Betws-yn-Rhos

Bryn

Caerhun

Colwyn

Conwy

Craig-y-don

Deganwy

Eglwysbach a Llangernyw

Eirias

Gele and Llanddulas

Glyn

Glyn y Marl

Gogarth Mostyn

Kinmel Bay

Llandrillo-yn-Rhos

Llanrwst a Llanddoged

Llansanffraid

Llansannan

Llysfaen

Mochdre

Pandy

Pen-sarn Pentre Mawr

Penmaenmawr

Penrhyn

Rhiw

Tudno

Tywyn/Towyn

Uwch Aled

Uwch Conwy

References 

Conwy County Borough Council elections
Conwy County Borough Council election